Roisan is a town and comune in the Aosta Valley region of north-western Italy. It is located on the left shore of the Buthier river, in the lower Valpelline.

References

Cities and towns in Aosta Valley